Franco Pierre Ferrari Martínez (born 23 April 1987) is a Peruvian footballer who plays as a midfielder. He is currently a free agent.

Career
Ferrari played for Coronel Bolognesi in the 2003 Torneo Descentralizado, making one appearance in the Peruvian top-flight. In 2006, the midfielder again featured just once in the Peruvian Primera División, this time for José Gálvez who were eventually relegated to the Peruvian Segunda División; a league Ferrari featured in for Universidad San Marcos in 2011, being selected six times.

Career statistics
.

References

External links

1987 births
Living people
Place of birth missing (living people)
Peruvian footballers
Association football midfielders
Peruvian Primera División players
Peruvian Segunda División players
Coronel Bolognesi footballers
José Gálvez FBC footballers
Deportivo Universidad San Marcos footballers